Malaysia–Oman relations (Jawi: هوبوڠن مليسيا–اومن) refers to the bilateral relationship between Malaysia and Oman. Malaysia has an embassy in Muscat, and Oman has an embassy in Kuala Lumpur.

History 
Official diplomatic relations were established in 1983, followed with the establishment of Malaysian embassy in Muscat in the same year. While Oman establishing its embassy in Kuala Lumpur on 2011.

Economic relations 
The total trade between the two countries grew from $28.1 million in 1995 to $1.06 billion in 2006 with Malaysia's exports to Oman increased from $26.4 million to $108 million and imports expanded from $1.7 million to $956 million. In 2009, a memorandum of understanding (MoU) was signed between Malaysia and Oman to improve co-ordination of trade and small and medium-sized enterprises (SMEs). The trade stood at nearly RM500 million during January–October 2010, with Malaysia's main exports to Oman being edible oil, machinery, appliances and parts, wood products, electrical and electronic products. Oman and Malaysia signed an agreement for Oman to import frozen chicken from Malaysia, costing RM120 million. Oman imports most of its food, up to 80%. Both countries are working to increase their trade relationship. In 2011, Shell Malaysia Trading Sdn Bhd (SMTSB) signed a sale and purchase agreement with Oman's National Gas Co SAOG (NGC) to divest its liquefied petroleum gas (LPG) business in West Malaysia at an undisclosed amount. An agreement in cyber security co-operation was also signed between the two countries in 2015.

In 2011, there are around 1,300 Omani students in Malaysia with 30,000 tourists from Oman have visiting Malaysia, while 1,000 Malaysians are working in Oman mainly in oil and gas, construction medical and as academicians.

References 

 
Oman
Bilateral relations of Oman